Williams County is the name of some counties in the United States of America

 Williams County, North Dakota 
 Williams County, Ohio